"XS" is a song by Japanese-British singer-songwriter Rina Sawayama, released on 2 March 2020, as the third single off of her debut studio album, Sawayama, via the label Dirty Hit. The song criticises capitalism in the face of climate change over a pop, R&B, avant-pop and electropop backing. A remix featuring British artist Bree Runway, was released on 10 July 2020.

Background, themes and composition
Sawayama said in a statement that "XS" is a song that "mocks capitalism in a sinking world":

"XS" is a 2000s-inspired pop, R&B, avant-pop and electropop song with "upbeat bubblegum pop vibes" composed in the key of D minor with a tempo of 117 beats per minute. It begins with an "eerie" buildup of violins, while a "shredding" guitar riff appears before and after the chorus.

Music video
The music video for "XS" was uploaded on YouTube on 17 April 2020, the same day as Sawayama's self-titled debut album was released. It currently has over 8 million views, making it the most-viewed video on Sawayama's channel. It was directed by Ali Kurr, who had also previously directed the music video for her other single, "STFU!".

In the video, Sawayama portrays a "QVC-like" "robotic" saleswoman who attends a shopping channel broadcast to promote a beverage named "RINA Water", which consists 99% of 24-karat gold and 1% of plasma. Later it is revealed that the liquid is extracted from a creature which is chained in an underground factory.

Live performance
On 26 October 2020, Sawayama gave her first televised performance ever on The Tonight Show Starring Jimmy Fallon, where she performed "XS".

Track listing
Digital download/streaming
"XS" – 3:21

Digital download/streaming – Bree Runway Remix
"XS" (Bree Runway Remix) – 3:22

Reception

Critical response
"XS" received widespread critical acclaim upon its release. From over 20 outlets, global critic aggregator Acclaimed Music placed "XS" as the 20th best song of 2020.

While reviewing Sawayama's second album Hold the Girl, Cat Zhang of Pitchfork named "XS" her debut album's best song, commenting that "[the song] was intended as arch anti-capitalist critique in an age of climate crisis, but its luxe vision was a better sell for being the rich, not eating them; Sawayama whispered "excess" as if it were the name of a designer perfume, the scent of “more” intoxicating."

Accolades

References 

Rina Sawayama songs
2020 songs
2020 singles
Dirty Hit singles
Songs about consumerism
Songs about climate change
Avant-pop songs
Songs written by Nate Campany
Songs against capitalism
Environmental songs
Songs written by Rina Sawayama